Smith Family Farmstead, also known as Riverside, is a historic home located at Upper Makefield Township, Bucks County, Pennsylvania. It was built in 1767, and is a -story, three bay by two bay, gable roofed stone dwelling.  A one bay by two bay, stone and frame addition was built in 1945.  Also on the property is a contributing two-story stone building used as a garage.  It was the birthplace of U.S. Senator from Indiana Oliver H. Smith (1794-1859).

It was added to the National Register of Historic Places in 1978.

Gallery

References

Houses on the National Register of Historic Places in Pennsylvania
Houses completed in 1767
Houses in Bucks County, Pennsylvania
1767 establishments in Pennsylvania
National Register of Historic Places in Bucks County, Pennsylvania